Eulytoceras is an extinct genus of ammonoid cephalopods belonging to the family Lytoceratidae. These fast-moving nektonic carnivores  lived in the Cretaceous period, from Hauterivian age to Barremian age.

Species

 Eulytoceras anisoptychum Uhlig, 1883
 Eulytoceras inaequalicostatus d'Orbigny, 1840
 Eulytoceras phestum Matheron, 1878

Description

Distribution
Fossils of species within this genus have been found in the Cretaceous rocks of Antarctica, Austria, Canada, Italy, Madagascar, South Africa and Spain.

References

Cretaceous ammonites
Fossils of Antarctica
Ammonitida genera
Lytoceratidae